Rhamnus integrifolia, also known as , is a species of flowering plant in the family Rhamnaceae.

Distribution
It is endemic to the Canary Islands, and found only in the Cumbres and Barrancos, south of Tenerife. It grows in Mediterranean Matorral shrubland habitats.

The Canary Islands, located off the northeast coast of Africa in Macaronesia, are a territory of Spain.

References

integrifolia
Endemic flora of the Canary Islands
Matorral shrubland
Vulnerable flora of Africa
Garden plants of Africa
Taxonomy articles created by Polbot